The Teutonic Order Research Centre, is a research institution at the Julius-Maximilian University of Würzburg. It is dedicated to the history of the Teutonic Order, with a particular focus on the regional history of Franconia.

History 

By 1219, members of the Teutonic Order had settled in the Tauber-Franconian city of Mergentheim. In 1527 the Order’s headquarters were established there. From its early days, the Order was also based in Würzburg. Because of this long historical tradition, in 2010 Dieter Salch - Honorary Chevalier of the Teutonic Order and proud citizen of Würzburg - asked University President Prof. Alfred Forchel to consider founding a Teutonic Order Research Center at the University of Würzburg.

The Teutonic Order Research Center was established in the Leighton Barracks, home of the 1st Infantry Division of the United States of America. After the transformation of part of the barracks into Campus Hubland North, the former Elementary School was refurbished and opened for use. The archive of the University of Würzburg and an institute for the social and cultural history of university students (Institut für Hochschulkunde) additionally moved into the former Elementary School. The three institutions commonly use and manage the reading rooms and technical facilities such as the new mobile shelving in the archive.

The Center was inaugurated on July 3, 2014. Bruno Platter, Friedhelm Hofmann, Dieter Salch, Josef Schuster, Alfred Forchel, Paul Beinhofer, Christian Schuchardt, Bernhart Jähnig, Arno Mentzel-Reuters, Udo Arnold, Oliver Jörg and Edda Weise were present. Guests came from Poland, Belgium, Austria and Italy.

Focus 

The  Research Center is focused on the European-wide History of the Order - from the Mediterranean Countries to Prussia. It also has a strong connection to the Historical Landscape of Franconia (now the northern part of Bavaria). The Research Center is linked to the University of Würzburg and the University's Chair for the Regional History of Franconia, is the Director. Under his leadership, the Center aims to place the Order's history within Europe-wide history as well as in its more specific regional and local contexts. As a result, research focuses on comparative European regional history, including diverse political, religious and cultural references. At the same time, it researches the history of the Ballei (an Order’s administrative district) and the Teutonic Order's Commandery ('Komturei') of Franconia.

Most of the refurbishment costs of €400,000 were covered by the Free State of Bavaria. Additional funding came from Deutschen Gesellschaft für Hochschulkunde, Deutschherrenbund, Gesellschaft der Freunde und Förderer des Deutschen Ordens St. Mariens in Jerusalem and Dieter-Salch-Stiftung Pro Universitate.

Research 
Finished project:

 Dr. Youmans, Nicholas: Die Identität des Deutschen Ordens im Spiegel seiner Symbolhandlungen
 Kemmer, Katharina: Der Deutsche Orden in (Stadt)-Prozelten. Kommende, Herrschaftsstruktur, Territorialherrschaft. (Dissertation)

Current projects:

 Dr. Kemmer, Katharina: Unitas per varietatem? - Das mittelalterliche Siegel-Corpus Deutscher Orden. Ein Vergleich der Siegel der Ballei Franken, an der Etsch und im Gebirge, Österreich, Elsass-Burgund, Lothringen und des Deutschmeistertums. (Habilitationsprojekt)
 Baus, Tobias (M.A.): Zwischen Orden und Bürgern. Die Edition des ältesten Mergentheimer Stadtbuchs. (Arbeitstitel Dissertation)
 Weigand, Benedikt: Der Deutsche Orden und seine Balleien: Ein Vergleich zwischen Elsass-Burgund (Lothringen) und Preußen. (Arbeitstitel Dissertation)

Lectures and seminars 
Since 2012, lectures and seminars on the Teutonic Order have been regularly held at the Julius Maximilian University of Würzburg.

Library 
The Research center includes a library on the history of the Teutonic Order. The focus of the own collection is on the literature on research on the Teutonic Order in the early modern period. The inventory also includes the library of the Historical Commission for East and West Prussian Regional Research (HiKo).

Conferences 

 2017: Tagung der Ordines Militares: "Die Ritterorden in den regionalen kirchlichen Strukturen (Diözesen, Pfarreien, andere geistliche Institutionen)" in Thorn, Polen.
 2018: Vier-Ordens-Treffen, Nürnberg.
 2018: Internationale Fachtagung "Sigismund von Luxemburg, der Deutsche Orden und Polen-Litauen" an der Christian-Albrechts-Universität in Kiel.
 2018: Tagung der Internationalen Historischen Kommission zur Erforschung des Deutschen Ordens: "Akkon – Venedig – Marienburg. Mobilität und Immobilität im Deutschen Orden" in Marienburg.
 2019: Tagung der Ordines Militares "Die Kommunikation in den Ritterorden: Räume – Strukturen – Formen" in Thorn, Polen.
 2019: Editionswissenschaftliches Kolloquioum: "Urkundenbücher, Chroniken, Amtsbücher. Alte und neue Editionsmethoden." in Thorn, Polen.
 2021: Tagung der Ordines MIlitares: "Die Ritterorden und Frauen: Stifterinnen – Affiliierte – Schwestern – Heilige" in Thorn, Polen.

Excursions 
Since 2015, the FDO (also in cooperation with various chairs of the Julius Maximilians University) has organized excursions in the footsteps of the Teutonic Order.

 2015: Auf den Spuren des Deutschen Ordens ins Polen (Poland)
 2017: Auf den Spuren des Deutschen Ordens in Belgien und den Niederlanden (Belgium and the Netherlands)
 2019: Auf den Spuren des Deutschen Ordens im Gebiet Kaliningrad (Russia) 
 2021: Stauferherrscher und Deutscher Orden in Apulien (Italia)

Cooperations 

 Hochmeisteramt des Deutschen Ordens in Wien
 Deutschordenszentralarchiv Wien
 Deutschherrenbund
 Internationale Historsiche Kommission zur Erforschung des Deutschen Ordens
 Historische Komission für ost- und westpreußische Landesforschung
 Centro interdipartimentale di ricerca sull'Ordine Teutonico nel Mediterraneo
 Max-Planck-Institut für Rechtsgeschichte und Rechtstheorie
 Deutschordensmuseum - Residenzschloss Mergentheim
 Staatsarchiv Ludwigsburg

Publications 

 Flachenecker, Helmut (Hrsg.): Ritter, Verwalter und Repräsentanten – Priester und Seelsorger (=Quellen und Studien zur Geschichte des Deutschen Ordens 79/Veröffentlichungen der Forschungsstelle Deutscher Orden an der Universität Würzburg 1), Weimar 2016.
 Flachenecker, Helmut (Hrsg.): Der Deutsche Orden auf dem Konstanzer Konzil. Pläne – Strategien – Erwartungen (=Quellen und Studien zur Geschichte des Deutschen Ordens 84/Veröffentlichungen der Forschungsstelle Deutscher Orden an der Universität Würzburg 3), Ilmtal-Weinstraße 2020.
 Kemmer, Katharina: Der Deutsche Orden in Prozelten. Kommende, Herrschaftsstruktur, Territorialherrschaft (=Quellen und Studien zur Geschichte des Deutschen Ordens 83/Veröffentlichungen der Forschungsstelle Deutscher Orden an der Universität Würzburg 2), Ilmtal-Weinstraße 2020.

External links 
 Forschungsstelle Deutscher Orden
Official Instagram account of the Teutonic Order Research Centre

References 

Research institutes in Germany
History of Franconia